is a former Japanese football player.

Playing career
Shinjo was born in Kunitachi on April 28, 1973. After graduating from Chuo University, he joined Japan Football League club Tokyo Gas (later FC Tokyo) in 1996. He became a regular player as right side back from first season. From 1997, he was converted to defensive midfielder and played many matches for the position with Satoru Asari. The club results rose year by year and won the champions in 1998. The club was promoted to new league J2 League from 1999. However his opportunity to play decreased in 1999. Although the club won the 2nd place in 1999 and was promoted to J1 League from 2000, he retired end of 1999 season without playing J1.

Club statistics

References

External links

1973 births
Living people
Horikoshi High School alumni
Chuo University alumni
People from Kunitachi, Tokyo
Association football people from Tokyo Metropolis
Japanese footballers
J2 League players
Japan Football League (1992–1998) players
FC Tokyo players
Association football midfielders